Norway competed at the 2016 Summer Olympics in Rio de Janeiro, Brazil, from 5 to 21 August 2016. Since the nation's debut in 1900, Norwegian athletes have appeared in every edition of the Summer Olympic Games, except for two occasions: the 1904 Summer Olympics in St. Louis and the 1980 Summer Olympics in Moscow, due to the country's support for the United States-led boycott.

Norwegian Olympic Committee and Confederation of Sports sent a team of 62 athletes, 29 men and 33 women, to compete in 13 sports at the Games. For only the fourth time in Olympic history, the Norwegian roster featured more female athletes than males, due to the participation of the women's handball squad at the Games, returning as two-time defending champions. Among the sports, Norway made its debut in golf (new to the 2016 Games) and triathlon, as well as returning to taekwondo after not being represented at London 2012.

Topping the list of athletes on the Norwegian roster were mountain biker and Athens 2004 champion Gunn-Rita Dahle Flesjå, who qualified for her fifth Olympic cross-country race as the oldest and most experienced female competitor (aged 43), and rowing legend Olaf Tufte, who sought to add to his medal tally with a fourth medal at his sixth straight Olympics.

Apart from Flesjå and Tufte, several Norwegian athletes also returned to compete in Rio de Janeiro, including handball team captain Kari Aalvik Grimsbø, middle-distance runner Henrik Ingebrigtsen in the men's 1500 m, Gambian-born sprinter Jaysuma Saidy Ndure, and small-bore rifle shooter and London 2012 finalist Ole-Kristian Bryhn, who was nominated by the committee to lead the delegation as the flag bearer in the opening ceremony.

Norway left Rio de Janeiro with four bronze medals, the country's worst Olympic performance since 1964, and the first time Norway competed without winning any gold medals since 1984. Greco-Roman wrestler Stig André Berge brought home the country's first medal in the sport after 24 years, while Tufte successfully completed a full set of medals by securing a bronze alongside his partner Kjetil Borch in the men's double sculls, following his silver from Sydney 2000, and two golds in the single sculls from Athens 2004 and Beijing 2008, respectively. Having entered the Games as two-time defending champions, the women's handball squad (led by Grimsbø) suffered a humiliating 37–38 defeat to Russia in the semifinals, but found some solace in overpowering the Dutch for the bronze.

Medalists

| width="65%" align="left" valign="top" |

|  style="text-align:left; width:22%; vertical-align:top;"|

Competitors
The following is the list of number of competitors participating in the Games. Note that reserves in handball are not counted as athletes:

| width=78% align=left valign=top |

Archery

One Norwegian archer has qualified for the men's individual recurve at the Olympics by virtue of a top five national finish at the 2016 Archery World Cup meet in Antalya, Turkey.

Athletics

Norwegian athletes have so far achieved qualifying standards in the following athletics events (up to a maximum of 3 athletes in each event):

On May 30, 2016, race walker Håvard Haukenes and long-distance runner Karoline Bjerkeli Grøvdal were the first Norwegian athletes in track and field to be officially selected to the Olympic roster. Two-time Olympian Erik Tysse, marathon runner Sondre Nordstad Moen, and discus thrower Sven Martin Skagestad were named as part of the second batch of nominated athletes on June 19, 2016. Eleven further athletes rounded out the track and field lineup for the Games on July 15, 2016.

Track & road events
Men

Women

Field events

Cycling

Road
Norwegian riders qualified for five quota places in the men's Olympic road race by virtue of their top 15 national finish in the 2015 UCI World Tour. One additional spot was awarded to the Norwegian cyclist in the women's road race by virtue of her top 100 individual placement in the 2016 UCI World Rankings.

Mountain biking
Norway has qualified one mountain biker for the women's Olympic cross-country race, as a result of her nation's tenth-place finish in the UCI Olympic Ranking List of May 25, 2016.

BMX
Norwegian riders qualified for one men's quota place for BMX at the Olympics, as a result of the nation's top four finish in the UCI BMX Individual Ranking List of May 31, 2016. BMX rider Tore Navrestad were named as part of the second batch of nominated athletes to the Olympic roster on June 19, 2016.

Golf 

Norway has entered three golfers into the Olympic tournament. Espen Kofstad (world no. 291), Suzann Pettersen (world no. 18), and Marianne Skarpnord (world no. 155) qualified directly among the top 60 eligible players for their respective individual events based on the IGF World Rankings as of 11 July 2016.

Gymnastics

Artistic
Norway has entered one artistic gymnast into the Olympic competition for the first time since 2000. Stian Skjerahaug had claimed his Olympic spot in the men's apparatus and all-around events at the Olympic Test Event in Rio de Janeiro.

Men

Handball

Summary

Women's tournament

The Norwegian women's handball team qualified for the Olympics by winning the 2015 World Championships in Denmark.

Team roster

Group play

Quarterfinal

Semifinal

Bronze medal match

Rowing

Norway has qualified three boats for each of the following rowing classes into the Olympic regatta. Two rowing crews had confirmed Olympic places for their boats each in the men's single sculls and men's pair at the 2015 FISA World Championships in Lac d'Aiguebelette, France, while the men's double sculls rowers had added one more boat to the Norwegian roster as a result of their top two finish at the 2016 European & Final Qualification Regatta in Lucerne, Switzerland. The rowing team was named as part of the first batch of nominated athletes to the Olympic roster on May 30, 2016.

Qualification Legend: FA=Final A (medal); FB=Final B (non-medal); FC=Final C (non-medal); FD=Final D (non-medal); FE=Final E (non-medal); FF=Final F (non-medal); SA/B=Semifinals A/B; SC/D=Semifinals C/D; SE/F=Semifinals E/F; QF=Quarterfinals; R=Repechage

Sailing

Norwegian sailors have qualified one boat in each of the following classes through the 2014 ISAF Sailing World Championships, the individual fleet Worlds, and European qualifying regattas.

On May 30, 2016, returning Olympian Kristian Ruth (Laser), along with Finn yachtsman Anders Pedersen and skiff sisters Ragna and Maia Agerup, were the first Norwegian sailors to be officially selected to the Olympic roster. Meanwhile, windsurfer Maria Mollestad and Laser Radial sailor Tiril Bue rounded out the crew selection as part of the second batch of nominated athletes on June 19, 2016.

M = Medal race; EL = Eliminated – did not advance into the medal race

Shooting

Norwegian shooters have achieved quota places for the following events by virtue of their best finishes at the 2014 and 2015 ISSF World Championships, the 2015 ISSF World Cup series, and European Championships or Games, as long as they obtained a minimum qualifying score (MQS) by March 31, 2016. Two-time Olympian Are Hansen, along with returnees Odd Arne Brekne, Ole Kristian Bryhn, and Malin Westerheim from London 2012, were named to the Olympic roster at the Munich leg of the ISSF World Cup series on June 1, 2016.

Qualification Legend: Q = Qualify for the next round; q = Qualify for the bronze medal (shotgun)

Swimming

Norwegian swimmers have so far achieved qualifying standards in the following events (up to a maximum of 2 swimmers in each event at the Olympic Qualifying Time (OQT), and potentially 1 at the Olympic Selection Time (OST)):

Taekwondo

Norway entered one athlete into the taekwondo competition at the Olympics. Tina Skaar secured a place in the women's heavyweight category (+67 kg) by virtue of her top two finish at the 2016 European Qualification Tournament in Istanbul, Turkey.

Triathlon

Norway has entered one triathlete to compete at the Games. Kristian Blummenfelt was ranked among the top 43 eligible triathletes in the men's event based on the ITU Olympic Qualification List as of May 15, 2016.

Wrestling

Norway has qualified two wrestlers for each of the following weight classes into the Olympic competition. One of them had claimed an Olympic spot in the men's Greco-Roman 59 kg with his semifinal triumph at the initial meet of the World Qualification Tournament in Ulaanbaatar, while the other did the same feat in the women's freestyle 69 kg at the final meet in Istanbul.

Men's Greco-Roman

Women's freestyle

See also
Norway at the 2016 Summer Paralympics

References

External links 

 

Olympics
Nations at the 2016 Summer Olympics
2016